The Uruguayan Chess Federation ( – FUA) is the national organisation for chess in Uruguay. It is affiliated with the World Chess Federation. 

Established in 1926, its headquarters are in Montevideo. Its current chairperson is Carlos Milans.

It organizes the Uruguayan Chess Championship once a year.

References

External links 
 Website

Chess
National members of FIDE
Chess in Uruguay
1926 establishments in Uruguay
Sports organizations established in 1926
Chess organizations